Pedro Rodríguez de la Vega (18 January 1940 – 11 July 1971) was a Mexican sports car and Grand Prix motor racing driver. He was the older brother of Ricardo Rodríguez. Both brothers started racing at an early age, first on motorbikes and then moving to cars. Following his brother's death in a racing accident in 1962, Pedro briefly considered retiring from racing, but decided to carry on.

In sports car racing his first major win was with his brother Ricardo in the 1961 Paris 1000km, driving a Ferrari 250 GT. He won the 1968 24 Hours of Le Mans in a Ford GT40 and in 1970-71 he won eight races in a Porsche 917.

He began his Formula One career in 1963, and won the 1967 South African Grand Prix in a Cooper and the 1970 Belgian Grand Prix in a BRM.

He was killed at the Norisring in Nuremberg, West Germany, on 11 July 1971 driving a Ferrari 512 M in an Interserie sports car race.

Personal life

Rodríguez was born in Mexico City, Mexico, the second son of Pedro Natalio Rodríguez and Concepción De la Vega. He had an older sister, Conchita, and three younger brothers: Ricardo, Federico (died at two months of age) and Alejandro.

At 15, his father sent him to Western Military Academy in Alton, Illinois in order to learn English and to develop more discipline.

The Rodríguez brothers raced bicycles and motorcycles, becoming Mexican national motorcycle champions in 1953 and 1954. Pedro made his international debut in cars at Nassau in 1957 in a Ferrari.

He married Angelina (née Dammy), in Mexico in 1961, although he had a girlfriend in England, Glenda Foreman, with whom he lived in Bray on Thames in his later years, but left no children.

Rodríguez always traveled with a Mexican flag and a record of the national anthem because when he won the 1967 South African GP the organizers did not have the Mexican anthem, and instead played the Mexican hat dance.

Jo Ramírez was a very close friend to both Rodríguez as well as his younger brother Ricardo.

Career

Rodríguez began racing with bicycles at eight years old. He was a class winner in the Mexican Championship by 1950. He started racing a  Adler motorcycle, winning Mexico's national championship in 1952 and 1954. In 1952, he entered a rally in a Ford, but achieved little. He returned to racing full-time in 1955, at 15, entering a Jaguar XK120 or Porsche 1600S in local contests.

At the end of 1957, Rodríguez (who had been driving a Chevrolet Corvette in Mexico) and his brother entered the Nassau Speed Week competition, where the wild-driving elder brother wrecked his Ferrari 500 TR.

The 18-year-old Rodríguez shared a 500 TR at Le Mans, entered by U.S. importer Luigi Chinetti, with José Behra, brother of Jean Behra, as his co-driver; the car did not finish, after a radiator hose puncture. Rodríguez came back every year to Le Mans, fourteen times in total, and won in 1968, co-driving with Belgian Lucien Bianchi, sharing a Ford GT40 for the JW–Gulf team.

At the Rheims 12-hours in 1958, Rodríguez and Behra placed second in class (eighth overall) in their Porsche Carrera, while Rodríguez came second in a Ferrari 250 TR at Nassau at the end of the season.

Rodríguez went to Europe to race starting in 1959, sharing a Porsche 1600 S with Leo Levine at the Nurbürgring 1000 km, which came in second in class (thirteenth overall). He shared a  O.S.C.A.  with his brother for Le Mans, which broke.

At Cuba's 1960 Liberty Grand Prix, Rodríguez's 250TR followed Stirling Moss's winning Maserati Tipo 61 home, in second. At Sebring, his Dino 196 S failed to finish. Rodríguez claimed seventh at the 1960 Targa Florio, again in the  196 S, which spent time off the pavement as well as on. He retired from that year's Nürburgring 1000 km, and from Le Mans.

In 1961, Rodríguez entered Formula Junior. He returned also to Sebring, sharing a 250TR with his brother which suffered electrical trouble and came third. The duo also failed to finish that year's Targa Florio or Nur 1000 km, but did win the Paris 1000 km. An ongoing duel with the works Ferraris at Le Mans, which ultimately resulted in engine failure only two hours from the end, attracted the attention of Enzo Ferrari, who offered them Formula One rides with his team. Pedro declined, having "a motor business in Mexico City to run".

Despite his refusal, Rodríguez kept racing, and in 1962 entered at Sebring, the Nurb, and Le Mans, but failed to finish each time. He won at Bridgehampton, in a Ferrari 330 TRI/LM, and shared a 250 GTO with his brother to win the Paris 1000 km, the second year in a row.
 
After Ferrari refused to enter the 1962 Mexican Grand Prix, the first to be held in Mexico, Rodríguez and his younger brother both found rides of their own. After his brother was killed in a horrific accident in practice, Rodríguez withdrew. He considered retiring from racing. However, in 1963 he won the Daytona Continental in a 250GTO entered by North American Racing Team. He came third at Sebring, sharing a 330TR/LM with Graham Hill. He failed to qualify at Indianapolis, in an Aston Martin-powered Cooper T54, but took part in his first Grands Prix in the works Lotus at Watkins Glen and Magdalena Mixhuca. Rodríguez failed to finish both times.

Also in 1963, driving for Kjell Qvale Racing, he won his second USRRC ( FIA  Group 7  cars) event in the Huffaker chassis#2 Mk8 GENIE/Chevrolet, then went on to win again in their chassis#3 Mk8 GENIE/Ford 

For 1964, he again won the Daytona Continental, as well as the sports car Canadian Grand Prix, was second at the Paris 1000 km, and third in the Bahamas Tourist Trophy. In single-seater racing, he recorded a sixth in the Ferrari 156 at Mexico.

In 1965, his Lotus 33-Climax was fourth at the Daily Express Silverstone Trophy, fifth at the U.S. Grand Prix and seventh in the Mexican Grand Prix in a Ferrari. He won the Rheims 12-Hours in a Ferrari 365 P2 he shared with Jean Guichet, and scored a third at the Canadian Sports Car Grand Prix.

He drove again for Lotus in four events in 1966, retiring on every occasion. He also deputised for Jim Clark in the Formula Two event at Rouen.

At the start of the 1967 season, Rodríguez won in only his ninth Grand Prix, at Kyalami. Cooper manager Roy Salvadori allowed Rodríguez to drive the practice car, over the objections of teammate Jochen Rindt, who had demanded Rodríguez's car, with strong support from Rindt's close friend Jackie Stewart. Rodríguez's smooth, consistent driving earned him victory after Denny Hulme had had a lengthy pit stop and local privateer John Love's Tasman Cooper needed a late fuel stop. Rindt, by contrast, retired the other Cooper-Maserati after 38 laps. Rodríguez drove a controlled season in 1967 as No. 2 to Rindt. Though usually slower than his teammate, he built up experience in the older and heavier T81, while Rindt was given the improved T81B and later the brand new T86. A mid-season accident in a Protos-Ford, at the Formula Two event at Enna, sidelined him for three Grands Prix. Rodríguez was only marginally slower than Rindt in the Dutch Grand Prix, also the only other race in the season where the Coopers were competitive.

His performance at Zandvoort earned Rodríguez a better drive with, BRM in 1968. Rodríguez proved himself excellent in the wet at Zandvoort and Rouen where he got his only fastest lap in F1 during the French GP. Lack of power meant he had to settle for second behind Bruce McLaren in Belgian GP at Spa.

The BRM P133 faded through the year from lack of testing time after the death of Mike Spence, whom the team's owners favoured. Nevertheless, Rodríguez led the Spanish Grand Prix from Chris Amon for 28 laps until he made a mistake and spun off. At the end of the year, despite Rodríguez's good performances, BRM team manager Louis Stanley released Rodríguez to the Parnell BRM privateer team.

The Reg Parnell Racing BRMs proved to have hopeless engines, and after Monaco, Rodríguez left and signed for Ferrari for the remainder of the 1969 Grand Prix and sports car series.

Reentering F1 in the British Grand Prix, Rodríguez matched teammate Amon's pace in practice and led Amon by a whisker in the race. The uncompetitive 312s ran midfield until Rodríguez's car broke and Amon's engine blew for the second race in a row. Given the hopelessness of the 312 V12, the frustration of his drivers, and the slow progress with getting the new flat-12 F1 car ready, Enzo Ferrari would rather have run two Italian drivers for the rest of the season, but the Brambilla brothers, Vittorio and Ernesto, proved too slow. So, Ferrari ran Rodríguez in the last four races of the season, in NART American racing colours for the North American races, but still, effectively, as a Ferrari works team. In the underpowered car, Rodríguez managed a fourth in 1968; sixth in 1964, 1967 and 1970; and seventh in 1965 and 1969; places in his six home races in Mexico, but Ferrari didn't offer him a ride for 1970.

BRM only offered him a ride in 1970 after John Surtees decided to leave to set up his own team at the last minute. For most of 1970, Stanley clearly favoured Jackie Oliver as number one driver, perhaps partly in response to Stewart's opinion of Rodríguez and possibly because of his "old-boys' club" of Englishmen at the team. At Spa, Rodríguez won with his BRM P153 over the new March of Chris Amon by just 1.1 seconds and with an average speed of 149.94 mph (241.31 km/h), then the highest average speed in the history of F1, Jean-Pierre Beltoise got the third place in Matra.

The power of the V12 engines was particularly suited to the fast circuits with few really slow corners, such as Spa, Monza, and to a degree Brands and Nürburgring, and that was usually the case with the BRM, Matra, and Weslake engined cars. A strong drive at St Jovite saw him finish 4th. Only the need to pit in the last laps for fuel robbed him of a victory at Watkins Glen, the highest paying event of the year at the time, US$50,000. The winner was  Emerson Fittipaldi, who got the first victory of his career in F1.

After many years racing for Ferrari in the World Championship of Makes for sports cars, he signed for JW-Gulf-Porsche in 1970 and over the next two years won eight races driving a Porsche 917, contributing to Porsche winning in the World Sportscar Championship.

Rodríguez developed into one of the sport's great all-rounders, racing CanAm, NASCAR, rallies and even becoming North American Ice Racing champion in 1970, invited by the Alaska Sports Car Club from Anchorage, the race was in Sand Lake.

Rodríguez debuted in NASCAR at Trenton Speedway in 1959, finishing 6th. At the 1963 Firecracker 400 he qualified 9th but retired after an engine failure. The Mexican finished 5th in the 1965 World 600, his best result. At the 1971 Daytona 500 he finished 13th. His last NASCAR race was Miller High Life 500, where he retired early with electrical issues

Rodríguez drove a Ferrari 312 P Coupé in the CanAm round of Bridgehampton in 1969, finishing 5th. In 1970 he finished 3rd at Riverside and 5th at Laguna Seca Raceway with a factory BRM P154.

The 1971 Formula One season could have seen him as a championship contender, with a BRM P160 being prepared by Tony Southgate, and for once BRM had consistently good engines. BRM, however, was overextended, trying to run three, and later four, cars. Rodríguez challenged Jacky Ickx magnificently in the rain during the Dutch Grand Prix, and only just failed to win.

Death
Rodríguez was killed in an Interserie sports car race at Norisring in Nuremberg, West Germany, on 11 July 1971. Rodríguez was at the wheel of a Ferrari 512 M of Herbert Müller Racing, his friend and teammate at the Targa Florio in 1971.
A contemporary source reported that trackside photographers noticed his right front tyre coming away from the rim under heavy braking for the sharp s-bend as early as the 10th lap. On lap 12, the tyre came off completely, sending the car into a wall before rebounding across the track and catching fire. He died shortly after he was extracted from the wreck.

Legacy
Rodríguez was considered the best driver of his era in the wet. Along with Jo Siffert, he was considered the bravest driver in motorsport, an example of this being the two touching through the then-very narrow and very dangerous Eau Rouge corner in the rain in their 917s at the start of the 1970 1000km of Spa-Francorchamps. Rodríguez is widely considered to be Mexico's greatest ever racing driver.

In 2016, in an academic paper that reported a mathematical modeling study that assessed the relative influence of driver and machine, Rodríguez was ranked the 24th-best Formula One driver of all time.

After winning the LMP2 class at the 2013 24 Hours of Le Mans, the first class victory for a Mexican driver since Rodríguez, Ricardo González recognized Rodríguez as his hero.

Commemoration

The first hairpin at Daytona International Speedway (the right-hand hairpin) is named the Pedro Rodríguez curve. In 1973 the Mexico City race track Magdalena Mixuhca, where F1, Champ Car, NASCAR and other series race was renamed for him and Ricardo: Autódromo Hermanos Rodríguez (Rodríguez Brothers Autodrome).

In July 2006, a bronze plaque was placed at the site of his crash in Nuremberg, a joint effort by Scuderia Rodríguez (the friends foundation) and the city authorities. Its Secretary General, Carlos Jalife, published the Rodríguez brothers' biography in December 2006, with an English translation which won the Motor Press Guild Book of the Year award in 2009.

Sergio Pérez wore a specially-designed crash helmet tributing Pedro Rodríguez for the 2022 Monaco Grand Prix in which he went on to claim his third win in Formula One. The helmet featured Rodríguez's helmet colours and, on the top, Rodríguez's and Perez's combined wins and podiums before Perez's victory in the 2022 Monaco Grand Prix, as the only two Mexican Formula One drivers to achieve race victories. Below the statistics was written "AND COUNTING" and the phrase "GRACIAS PEDRO" (thank you Pedro) below that.

Racing record

Formula One World Championship results
(key) (Races in bold indicate pole position; races in italics indicate fastest lap)

Formula One Non-Championship results
(key) (Races in bold indicate pole position; races in italics indicate fastest lap)

Pedro Rodríguez at Ferrari

Pedro Rodríguez at Porsche

Pedro Rodríguez in the 24 Hours of Le Mans

Notes

Sources 
Jalife-Villalón, Carlos Eduardo. The Brothers Rodríguez. Phoenix: David Bull Publishing, 2009. (Translated and enlarged by the author from the 2006 Mexican edition)
Kettlewell, Mike. "Rodriguez: The young lions of Mexico", in Ward, Ian, general editor. The World of Automobiles, Volume 16, pp. 1915–17.  London: Orbis, 1974.

External links 

History of Norisring races
GrandPrix.com
Fan Page
Career stats, courtesy GrandPrixStats.com

Mexican racing drivers
Mexican Formula One drivers
Ferrari Formula One drivers
North American Racing Team Formula One drivers
Team Lotus Formula One drivers
Cooper Formula One drivers
BRM Formula One drivers
Reg Parnell Racing Formula One drivers
Formula One race winners
24 Hours of Le Mans drivers
24 Hours of Le Mans winning drivers
12 Hours of Reims drivers
24 Hours of Daytona drivers
World Sportscar Championship drivers
Tasman Series drivers
NASCAR drivers
Racing drivers who died while racing
Sport deaths in Germany
Racing drivers from Mexico City
Mexican people of Spanish descent
Mexican expatriate sportspeople in Germany
1940 births
1971 deaths
Porsche Motorsports drivers